Patrik Björck (born 1957) is a Swedish politician, trade unionist and member of the Riksdag, the national legislature. A member of the Social Democratic Party, he has represented Västra Götaland County East since October 2006.

Björck was born and educated in Gothenburg. He is the son of architect Folke Björck and sociologist Helena Björck (née Nolin). He has held various jobs including food worker, brewery worker, tram driver, nursing assistant and wood worker. He has held various roles at the GS trade union. He has been a member of the municipal council in Falköping Municipality since 1998.

Björck lives in Solberga near Åsarp. He is married and has five children and three grandchildren.

References

1957 births
Living people
Members of the Riksdag 2006–2010
Members of the Riksdag 2010–2014
Members of the Riksdag 2014–2018
Members of the Riksdag 2018–2022
Members of the Riksdag 2022–2026
Members of the Riksdag from the Social Democrats
People from Falköping Municipality
Politicians from Gothenburg
Swedish trade unionists